Oncidium altissimum, Wydler's dancing-lady orchid, is a species of orchid native to the West Indies (Cuba, Puerto Rico and the Lesser Antilles), with an 18th-Century citation from Jamaica.

This name should not be confused with the illegitimate homonym Oncidium altissimum Lindl. 1833, now considered a synonym of O. baueri native to South America. The true Oncidium altissimum was first described in 1760 by Nicolaus Joseph von Jacquin with the name Epidendrum altissimum, citing Jamaica as the origin of the specimen he was describing . Olof Swartz later transferred the species to Oncidium in 1800.

References

altissimum
Orchids of the Caribbean
Orchids of Cuba
Orchids of Haiti
Orchids of Jamaica
Orchids of Puerto Rico
Flora of the Windward Islands
Flora of the Leeward Islands
Plants described in 1760
Taxa named by Nikolaus Joseph von Jacquin
Flora without expected TNC conservation status